quiznation was a live interactive game show on GSN.  The official host was Shandi Finnessey, with Angelle Tymon, Jessica York, Jeff Thisted (and Mel Peachey before April)  filling in. Featured in the two-hour program were interactive games where the viewers could win cash prizes. The show aired from 12 midnight - 2 a.m.  Eastern every Wednesday night through Saturday night (technically early Thursday through early Sunday morning in the Eastern Time zone). The program was nearly identical to the original PlayMania.

Format
On quiznation, the contestants were home viewers. American residents 18 or older could enter the contest by text messaging a request or using the network's website. Potential contestants may enter up to ten (twenty in the final month) times per phone number on each show.

After a few moments, a contestant is notified whether or not their entry is chosen (at random) to proceed to another random selection process. If an entry is selected in the second phase, the contestant will be called on his or her home or mobile phone, depending on the method of entry. The contestant will then come on-air and be given a chance to play if the game lasts long enough. After a game is completed, the queue is cleared and a new entry is required. GSN charges a $.99 fee for each text message entry, in addition to standard text messaging rates charged by the wireless provider. Entries on the website are free. Regardless of the method of entry, each entry has an equal chance of being selected. An entry does not necessarily guarantee an opportunity to appear on the show. Residents of certain states may be ineligible to play various entry methods.

Programming history
On February 20, 2007, PlayMania, the original GSN interactive game show, broke off into two separate programs, quiznation and 100 Winners. Collectively, the programs are known as the PlayMania Block.

On March 10, Jessica York filled in for Finnessey, who was preparing to compete on ABC's Dancing with the Stars. The next week, the spot was filled in by Mel Peachey, host of 100 Winners, on March 17 and 18.  Finnessey was eliminated from Dancing on April 3. She hosted every Friday during her tenure on the show.

The April 1 episode began as if 100 Winners was airing live with Shandi Finnessey, who had never appeared on 100 Winners, hosting. The first two "contestants" were asked questions "What show are you watching right now?" and "What is my name?", poking fun at the general ease of the answers on 100 Winners. Each "won" a $1,000 prize. The third question, "What day is today?", was answered by someone who said "April Fool's Day!". The program then cut to that night's episode of quiznation, hosted by Peachey. The May 1 episode marked Finnessey's first time actually hosting 100 Winners.

All three hosts appeared on the April 6 show, which marked the one-year anniversary of PlayMania. April 7 was Mel Peachey's "goodbye show", as she left the PlayMania Block to return home to England. On the April 21 show, after a week of eliminations, Angelle Tymon was introduced as the new host on the PlayMania Block.  Tymon hosted the second hour, taking over from York, with her solo debut coming the following night. She serves as back-up host to Finnessey.

A schedule change began May 6. A Sunday edition of 100 Winners aired in place of the previously scheduled quiznation. In its place, Thursdays will now feature an episode of quiznation. The May 18 edition featured the first appearance of  The Price Is Right contestant coordinator Jeff Thisted as a new host.

By June 14, 2007, all scheduled airings of 100 Winners had been replaced with quiznation. The show has been indefinitely canceled from the programming schedule, as it is no longer referenced in the official rules of the PlayMania Block. Also in the month of June, Optimistic Entertainment, the co-producer of PlayMania Block, went into administration.

On July 17, 2007, the Tuesday editions of quiznation were removed. The removal was to accommodate encore showings of Without Prejudice?. After September 2, 2007, the Sunday broadcast was removed as well, slightly over a year after it originally debuted.

The record for the most money given away on quiznation is $4,700. It was won on September 5, 2007 by a caller named Teresa.

quiznation aired its last episode, hosted by Jessica York, on October 31, 2007.

Games
quiznation featured various minigames that were played throughout the program; many are carry-overs from the original PlayMania. The rewards for the games were usually cash prizes ranging from $100 – $1,000 in cash, sometimes reaching up to, and over $2,000. There are a few methods quiznation employed to speed up a game or increase incentives for a game:

 Hints may be given by the host or the graphics operator to viewers
 Multiple guesses may be allowed
 The host could also increase the prize amount as an incentive, or alternatively, a certain number of callers set by the host will be playing for extra incentives.
 A "speed round", a period of time where callers are taken more quickly than usual, may be exercised.
 To provide a sixth answer to the polling games, the host sometimes utilized the "play-along pad" (a whiteboard) to record their personal answer to the game. The person who guesses that answer generally receives $50 – $75 in addition to any prize they may win in the main game.

These games were commonly played in rotation on quiznation.

Other features
quiznation occasionally featured e-mails sent by viewers. Each episode may have a requested theme for e-mails. The tone of the e-mails varied widely, from serious to silly. Pictures may also be encouraged to be included.

See also
 Quiz channel
 PlayMania
 100 Winners
 Quiznation (Original UK program)
 Take the Cake

Notes and references

External links
 PlayMania Block Official Site
 

Phone-in quiz shows
Game Show Network original programming
2000s American game shows
2007 American television series debuts
2007 American television series endings